Elections to the United States House of Representatives were held in Pennsylvania on October 14, 1800, for the 7th Congress.

Background
Thirteen Representatives (8 Democratic-Republicans and 7 Federalists) had been elected in the previous election

Congressional districts
Pennsylvania was divided into 12 districts, one of which (the ) was a plural district, with 2 Representatives.  This was the last election which used these districts.
The  consisted of the City of Philadelphia
The  consisted of Philadelphia County
The  consisted of Chester and Delaware Counties
The  (2 seats) consisted of Montgomery, Bucks and Northampton Counties
The  consisted of Berks and Luzerne County
The  consisted of Northumberland and Dauphin Counties
The  consisted of Lancaster County
The  consisted of York County
The  consisted of Mifflin and Cumberland County
The  consisted of Bedford, Huntingdon and Franklin Counties
The  consisted of Westmoreland and Fayette Counties
The  consisted of Allegheny and Washington Counties

The counties that made up the 5th district did not border each other.  That district was therefore made up of two separate pieces rather than being a single contiguous entity

Note: Many of these counties covered much larger areas than they do today, having since been divided into smaller counties

Election results
Nine incumbents (8 Democratic-Republicans and 1 Federalist) ran for re-election, all of whom won re-election. Ten Democratic-Republicans and three Federalists were elected, a net gain of 2 seats for the Democratic-Republicans.

Special elections 
There were three special elections following the October elections, one of which was for the outgoing Congress.

Neither served in the 7th Congress, and special elections were held in both districts on October 13, 1801

References 
Electoral data are from the Wilkes University Election Statistics Project

1800
Pennsylvania
United States House of Representatives